Mian Sarfaraz Kalhoro, known as Khudayar Khan, was the famous king of the Kalhora Dynasty that ruled Sindh from 1701 to 1783. He reigned from 1772 to 1775. He ascended the throne of Sindh after the death of his father Mian Ghulam Shah Kalhoro He was given the title of Khudayar Khan by the Mughal Emperor Shah Alam II and is known to have assisted Timur Shah Durrani prior to the Third Battle of Panipat.

The Rule of Mian Muhammad Sarafraz Khan 

Muhammad Sarafraz Khan was confirmed as the new king with the title of “Khudayar Khan” by the Afghan Emperor Ahmad Shah Durani. Next day after Mian Ghulam Shah’s death his son Mian Muhammad Sarafraz Khan was placed on the throne of Sind with the unanimous consent of the nobility of the Fakirs, or followers of the late Mian. Timur Shah Durrani the viceroy, hastened to send a robe of honour with his sanad confirming the new ruler with the title of “Khudayar Khan” in addition to his father’s title. The Derahs were also attached to him. Mian Muhammad Sarafraz Khan therefore prepared to go in that direction and started about the close of Zulhajj of the same year 1186 A.H. (1772 A.D.) He had to spend some months in settling the affairs of the Derhas, and on the 12th of Rabíussání, 1187 A.H. (1773 A.D.) he returned to Haidarabad. He was martyred in 1775 AD and buried in Hyderabad, Sindh. Mian Sarfraz Kalhoro ruled over Sindh from 1772 to 1775 AD.

About 1775, Miyan Sarfaraz Khan (1772-1775),  entering Cutch, took the route of Khavda and Sumrasar, intending to march to Bhuj, but the accounts of its strength frightened him, and leading the army to Chobari and Kanthkot, he married the daughter of the Thakor, and levying fines at Adhoi and other places returned to Sindh.          After returning from Cutch, some court officials who were jealous of Mian's Minister Mir Bahram Khan Talpur, incited Sarfaraz Khan to murder him. Sarfaraz Khan who was an inexperienced ruler killed Mir Bahram Khan. The murder of their chief led the Talpurs who before this were loyal to the Kalhoras to revolt against them during which Mian Sarfaraz Khan was killed. Sarfaraz Khan was a very good poet who compose religious poetry but a few of his verses survives in the book of Syed Thabit Ali Shah.

References

This article includes content derived from "History of Sind - translated from Persian books" by Mirza Kalichbeg Fredunbeg (1853-1929), published in Karachi in 1902 and now in the public domain.

Sindhi people
Kalhora dynasty
1775 deaths